In enzymology, an alcohol oxidase is an enzyme that catalyzes the chemical reaction

 a primary alcohol + O2  an aldehyde + H2O2

Thus, the two substrates of this enzyme are primary alcohol and O2, whereas its two products are aldehyde and H2O2.

This enzyme belongs to the family of oxidoreductases, specifically those acting on the CH-OH group of the donor with oxygen as the acceptor. It employs one cofactor, FAD.

Name
The systematic name of this enzyme class is alcohol:oxygen oxidoreductase. This enzyme is also called methanol oxidase and ethanol oxidase. Sometimes, this enzyme is called short-chain alcohol oxidase (SCAO) to differentiate it from long-chain-alcohol oxidase (LCAO), aryl-alcohol oxidase (AAO) and secondary-alcohol oxidase (SAO).

Reaction
Alcohol oxidases catalyzes the oxidation of primary alcohols to their corresponding aldehydes. Unlike alcohol dehydrogenases, they are unable to catalyze the reverse reaction. This is reflected in their cofactor as well—unlike alcohol dehydrogenases, which use NAD+, alcohol oxidases use FAD. SCAO is capable of oxidizing alcohols with up to 8 carbons, but their primary substrates are methanol and ethanol. 

Known inhibitors of this enzyme include H2O2, Cu2+, phenanthroline, acetamide, potassium cyanide, or cyclopropanone.

Properties
SCAO is an intracellular enzyme. Its common source are fungi and yeasts, but it has also been shown to be present in mollusks.

It appears as an octameric protein, except for SCAO from A. ochraceus, which has been shown to be a tetramer. Each of the subunites is 65-80 kDa. Nine SCAO isoforms have been found in Ogataea methanolica, which has been shown to be a result of different combinations of two different subunits in the octamers, each coded by a different gene.

Structural studies

Potential use
Several potential uses have been suggested for SCAO:
 Biosensors with amperometric detection can be used within beverage testing, fermentation monitoring, methanol and ethanol detection, body fluid screening, and toxicological and phorensic laboratories
 Chemical synthesis of various aldehydes including aroma and flavor chemicals, where it could appear as a cheaper and more eco-friendly alternative to current methods

References

 
 
 

EC 1.1.3
Flavoproteins
Enzymes of known structure